Immanuel Mar Thoma Church, Virginia is the first parish in the state of Virginia in the United States, under Diocese of North America and Europe of Mar Thoma Syrian Church of Malabar in India. Immanuel Mar Thoma Church, VA currently conducts its Holy Communion Service at the Community Lutheran Church located at Sterling, Virginia. The Parish is currently led by Vicar Rev. Renny Varghese.

Malankara Mar Thoma Syrian Church
Malankara Mar Thoma Syrian Church (Malankara Mar Thoma Suriyani Sabha as it is called in native Malayalam) is one of the oldest groups of praticising Christians in the world. Believed to be followers of one of the original disciples of Jesus Christ – Saint Thomas (also called Didimus or Thomas, the doubter). It is widely believed  that the Apostle St. Thomas came to Muziris on the south west coast of India in AD 52 and laid the foundations of Christianity in this part of the world.

Mar Thoma Church in the United States
The history of the Mar Thoma Church in the North American and European continents represents the dreams and aspirations of the faithful members of the Church. Commencing as a small prayer group in Queens, New York, in 1972, the first approved parish was recognized in New York in 1976. From this humble beginning, the Mar Thoma Church began to immeasurably grow within the last 30 years. In terms of functionality, the churches in this part of the world were grouped as a Zone of the Mar Thoma Church in 1982.

Immanuel Mar Thoma Church, Virginia, formation
Immanuel Mar Thoma Church, Virginia, was approved as a new parish of the Mar Thoma Syrian Church of Malabar, effective April 15, 2010, by the Synod of the Mar Thoma church which met on February 22, 2010. Rev M.M John was appointed by the Most Rev. Dr. Joseph Mar Thoma Metropolitan as the first vicar of the parish which is under the Diocese of North America & Europe. 
 
Since the early 1990s a dedicated group of Mar Thoma families have lived and worshiped in the Commonwealth of Virginia. These families longed for a place of worship closer to home and a place of Christian learning offered by Sunday school for their children. The information technology boom of the late 1990s brought a new wave of Mar Thoma families to Northern Virginia which was rapidly emerging as the Silicon Valley of the East. These families brought with them a desire for worship and fellowship with like-minded believers. The foundations for a future parish was laid over the years by these families as they participated actively in church organizations at the Mar Thoma Church of Greater Washington which as the parent church offered prayerful support to the infant parish.

Parish inauguration
On December 26, 2010, Diocesan Bishop Rt. Rev. Dr. Geevarghese Mar Theodosius Episcopa formally inaugurated Immanuel Mar Thoma Church, Virginia.

Vicar
Rev. Renny Varghese is the vicar of Immanuel Mar Thoma Church, Virginia, since May 1, 2021.

Former vicars

 Rev M. M. John served as vicar from April 2010 to Dec 2010.
 Rev. Dr. Philip Varghese served as vicar from January 2011 to April 2011.
 Rev. Roy Geevarghese served as vicar from May 2011 to April 2012.
 Rev. Jaisen Thomas served as vicar from May 2012 to April 2016.
 Rev. Alex Kolath served as vicar from May 2017 to September 2020.
 Rev. Prince Varughese served as interim vicar from September 2020 to April 2021.

Church organizations
The parish organizations or ministries are:
 Edavaka Mission (Parish Mission)
 Sunday School
 Choir
 Youth Fellowship
 Yuvajanasakhyam
 Sevika Sanghom (Women’s Ministry)
 Young Family Fellowship

Church parsonage
The church purchased a new property as parsonage on May 4, 2012, at Chantilly, Virginia. The vicar and his family stay at the parsonage.

Church land in Aldie for constructing a church building
The church purchased a land in Aldie, Virginia, on February 15, 2017, to construct a church building.

Fundraising project in 2014
The church conducted a raffle fundraiser in 2014.

References
 Diocese of North America & Europe
 Thomas the Apostle
 Malankara Mar Thoma Syrian Church
 List of Marthoma Syrian Churches in United States of America

External links
 Immanuel Mar Thoma Church, Virginia's Official website
 Diocese of North America and Europe
 Malankara Mar Thoma Syrian Church
 St Thomas Cross, Nazraney Sthambams & other Persian Crosses
 Time Magazine - St. Thomas in India
 IMTC, VA. Inauguration
 Ecumenical Outreach of IMTC, VA 
 Youth in Service - IMTC, VA

Asian-American culture in Virginia
Christianity in Virginia
Indian-American culture
Mar Thoma Syrian churches
Oriental Orthodoxy in the United States